Jan Sas Zubrzycki (25 June 1860 in Tłuste – 4 August 1935 in Lwów) was a Polish architect known for his work in the neo-Gothic style and originator of the so-called "Vistula style". His most notable design was the grand Governor's Palace in Lemberg (1876).
He was elected a member of the Board of the Union of Polish Scientific Societies in 1920, as representative of the Society for Protecting Monuments of Art and Culture.

Gallery

References

1860 births
1935 deaths
Architects from Lviv
Ruthenian nobility
Lviv Polytechnic alumni
Recipients of the Order of Polonia Restituta
19th-century Polish architects